National Housing Act may refer to:

 National Housing Act (Canada) of 1938, the first significant federal housing legislation adopted in Canada
 National Housing Act of 1934, the first significant federal housing legislation enacted in the United States
 Housing Act of 1937, also known as the Wagner-Steagall Act, which subsidized public housing in the United States
 Housing Act of 1949, a major post-World War II national housing policy enacted in the United States
 Housing Amendments of 1955 Act, 1955 amendments to the National Housing Act, see 84th United States Congress
 Housing and Urban Development Act of 1965, part of President Lyndon B. Johnson's "Great Society" program, which provided a national system of rent subsidies in the United States
 Housing and Urban Development Act of 1968, a United States law which created Ginnie Mae out of Fannie Mae